John Freedley (May 22, 1793 – December 8, 1851) was a Whig member of the U.S. House of Representatives from Pennsylvania.

Biography
John Freedley was born in Norristown, Pennsylvania.  He attended the public schools and Norristown Academy.  He served as an assistant to his father, who operated a brickyard.  He studied law, was admitted to the bar in 1820, and commenced practice in Norristown.  He also became interested in marble and soapstone quarries.

Freedley was elected as a Whig to the Thirtieth and Thirty-first Congresses.  He died in Norristown in 1851.  He was interred at Montgomery Cemetery, in West Norriton Township, Montgomery County, Pennsylvania, near Norristown.

There is a street named Freedley St. in Norristown.

Sources

The Political Graveyard

1793 births
1851 deaths
People from Norristown, Pennsylvania
Pennsylvania lawyers
Whig Party members of the United States House of Representatives from Pennsylvania
19th-century American politicians
Burials in Pennsylvania
19th-century American lawyers